Melmac is:

 A brand name of dinnerware molded from Melamine resin, made by American Cyanamid, most popular in the 1940s through the 1960s.
 The fictional planet and homeworld to the alien life form in the eponymously titled sitcom ALF (TV series) (see also New Melmac)
 A Staten Island, NY based ska band from the late 1990s.
 SKV Melmac, a university korfball club from Tilburg, Netherlands, re-established in 2005
 An acronym for the Maine Educational Loan Marketing Corporation
 A variety of Psilocybe cubensis mushrooms.